Sadar North Baptist Association (SNBA) is a Baptist Christian denomination in Tripura.  It is located within the West Tripura district of Tripura in India. As of 2014, SNBA had more than 21,000 members and 156 churches.

History 
SNBA started as a small circle within the Central Baptist Association of Tripura Baptist Christian Union (TBCU). It later on evolved and developed into a full-fledged association of TBCU with many churches affiliated to it. Today there are around more than 150 churches and fellowships within Sadar North Baptist Association. Some the pioneers of the Baptist's in Sadar North is Life Deacon Biralal Debbarma (one of the first three Christians in the Kokborok speaking community and the ex-President of SNBA) and the Late Rev. Rabindra Debbarma.

Birth  

Before its birth as a full association the SNBA was one of the four Pastoral Circles under the Central Baptist Association. As churches grew rapidly with more new believers everywhere in the state, the Annual Assembly Session of Tripura Baptist Christian Union which was held in Subhash Nagar (North Tripura) on 23–26 February 1989 passed resolution that the Circles (e.g., South, Udaipur, Saisawm Sazai, and Sadar North) be given the full status of Associations. And it was how the Sadar North Baptist Association was established as an Association in the month of February 1989.

The leaders of the newly born Association with the kind presence of Rev. Hnehliana, the then General Secretary of TBCU, met prayerfully on 25 March 1989 at Durga Chowdhury Baptist Church and formed the first Executive Committee of the Association on ad hoc basis. The first members selected for the Executive Committee were:
 President: Mr. Birolal Debbarma
 Secretary: Rev. Rabindra Debbarma
 Treasurer: Mr. Chandra Kanta Debbarma.

Faith and doctrine
SNBA is based on the principles of Baptist theology and doctrines and is strongly threaded and bounded by firm faith on Jesus Christ, Holy Spirit and the one and only omnipotent Father God.

Organization 

SNBA has the highest strength of Kokborok speaking Baptist community in Tripura.

Office 
The association is led by the Executive Secretary, Rev. Ranjit Debbarma, and has its head-office in Baptist Mission Compound, Arundhutinagar, Agartala.

The association is registered under the Tripura Baptist Christian Union (TBCU). The association is located within the West Tripura district of Tripura state in India.

Baptist Pastoral Circles 
SNBA has eight Pastoral Circles, namely:
 Mandwi Baptist Pastoral Circle.
 Dakdu Baptist Pastoral Circle.
 Champaknagar Baptist Pastoral Circle.
 Abhicharan Baptist Pastoral Circle.
 Jamilwng Baptist Pastoral Circle.
 Khumulwng Baptist Pastoral Circle.
 Hezamara Baptist Pastoral Circle.
 Borkathal Baptist Pastoral Circle.

Sadar North Baptist Women's Society (SNBWS)
President: Mrs. Sabita Debbarma  (Joygobind Baptist Church)
Secretary: Mrs. Anjali Debbarma (Agartala City Baptist Church)

Sadar North Baptist Sikla Bodol (SNBSB)
President: Moses Debbarma 
Secretary: Samson Debbarma

Sunday School Committee 
Convener: Evan. Lalnunsiama
Member: Rev. Nilmani Debbarma
Member: Ord. Evan. C. K. Chhoma.

Affiliated organisations

Schools 
The association runs four English Medium schools, namely:
 Yakhili Academy (in Khumulwng)
 Tipprah Academy (in Barkathal)
 Salka Academy (in Hezamara)
 Pohor Academy (in Burakha)

Hospital 
The foundation for a new hospital under the association was laid on 30 September 2013 for which the construction is underway.

Sponsored by: Sadar North Baptist Women Society (SNBWS)

Location: Patni Village, Borokathal Baptist Pastoral Circle (around 20 km from Agartala city).

Institute of Community Transformation 
Sponsored by Seva Bharat (Mission India)

Location: Madhab Baptist Church, Mandwi Baptist Pastoral Circle.

Statistics

SNBA Census

Workers 
The workers of Sadar North Baptist Association have been grouped mainly into five categories as below:
 Pastor
 Pro-Pastor
 Ordained Evangelist
 Evangelist
 Office Worker

Pastors 
The SNBA has 11 pastors working in various locations under it, except for Rev. R. K. Debbarma who is the Secretary of TBCU now and is posted for TBCU Head Office in Agartala. 

The pastors under SNBA are.
 Rev.Dr.C. K. Debbarma (General Secretary, TBCU)
 Rev. Nilmani Debbarma (B.Th, MRE)
 Rev. Mangal Debbarma (Secretary, Mandwi Pastoral Circle)
 Rev. Ranjit Debbarma(Executive Secretary, SNBA,B.Th,M.Th)
 Rev. Biswa Debbarma
 Rev. Charanjoy Rupini
 Rev. Chandramoni Debbarma (Secretary, SNBA, B.Th)
 Rev. Kishore Kr. Debbarma (B.T, M.Th)
 Rev. Manmohan Debbarma (B.Th)
 Rev. Barendra Debbarma (B.Th)
 Rev. Samendra Debbarma(B.Th)
 Pastor Sukuram Debbarma (B.Th)
 Pastor Sitaram Rupini(B. Th)
 Pastor Sushanta Debbarma(B. Th)
 Pastor Pradip Debbarma(B. Th)
 Pastor Kishore Debbarma(B. Th)
 Pastor Bijoy Debbarma(B. Th)
 Pastor Ratan Debbarma(B. Th)
 Pastor Ajit Debbarma (B. Th)
 Pastor Rajkumar Debbarm (B.Th)
 Pastor Rwngthoma Debbarma(B.Th)
 Pastor Joseph Debbarma(B.Th)

The pastors are allocated their postings anywhere in the association. They have been trained by theological colleges from various parts of India like Bangalore, New Delhi, and Silchar.

Pro.Pastor 

 Pastor Nripendra Debbarma (B.Th)
 Pastor Partha Sarathi Debbarma (B.Th)
 Pastor Sandhyaram Debbarma (B.Th)
 Pastor Mithun Rupini (M.Div)
 Pro.Pastor Biswajit Debbarma (B.D)
 Pastor. Brajendra Debbarma (M.Div)
 Pastor Ajendra Debbarma (M.Div)

Ordained evangelists  

 Ord.Evan. Zununsanga (Z.B.M. Missionary)
 Ord.Evan. Pianruala (JSBA Missionary)
 Ord.Evan. Lalnunsiama (Z.B.M. Missionary)
Ord.Evan. Lalnunchhunga (JSBA, Missionary)

Evangelists  
There are evangelists in SNBA.
 Evan. Mrs. Shikha Debbarma
 Evan. Nitya Debbarma(B.Th)
 Evan. Manoranjan Debbarma (B.D)
 Evan. Kishore(Yarwng) Debbarma (B.D)
 Evan. Manik Debbarma (B.D)
 Evan. Somchati Debbarma (B.D.)
 Evan. Sunil Debbarma(B.TH)
 Evan. Malendra Debbarma(B.Th)
 Evan. Debojit Debbarma(B.D)
 Evan. Sachin Debbarma(B.Th)
 Evan. Amit Debbarma
 Evan. Bijoy (Kothoma) Debbarma(M.DIV)
 Evan. Bishu Debbarma(B.D)
 Evan. Miss Ganga Debbarma 
 Evan. Bharat Debbarma
 Evan. Mantu Debbarma(B.D)

Evangelist-Teacher 
 E/T Jico Debbarma(B.Ed)(School)
 E/T Ajesh Debbarma(School)
 E/T John Rupini(School)
 E/T Siari Debbarma(School)
 E/T Mrs. Elemi Debbarma(B.Ed)(School)
 E/T Subasish Debbarma(B.Ed)(School)

Office staff  
 Evan. Arun Debbarma(Offic Assistant, B.Th)
 Mr. Pitor Debbarma (Accountant)
 Mr. Rabindra Debbarma (Driver)

Missionaries  
There are eight missionaries working in SNBA. Missionaries are mainly from four organisations:
 Baptist Church of Mizoram
 Evangelical Church of Maraland
 Jampui Sakhan Baptist Association
 Kailashahar Baptist Christian Association

Affiliated churches 
Some churches like Zion Baptist Church, Kisong Baptist Church, Jangalia Baptist Church, Abhicharan Baptist Church, Bhuban Chontai Baptist Church, and Khumulwng Baptist Church, have huge strength of members whereas others like churches like Roktia Baptist Church, and Rasu Baptist Church, have less strength of members.

The affiliated churches with foundation date are listed below according to the Pastoral Circles:

Abhicharan Baptist Pastoral Circle 

 Kisong (1973)
 Dofidar (1977)
 Rajghat (1977)
 Durga Choudhury Kami (1982)
 Abhicharan (1983)

 Wala Kami (1983)
 Lefunga (1987)
 Sadhiram (1988)
 Kainta Kwpra (1990)
 Habildar (1990)

 Twisa Kwthang (1992)
 Mokam (1993)
 Bokjur (2002)
 Twisa Kwchang (2006)
 Rojong (2006)

 Kumaribil (2006)
 Phota Kami (2007)
 Raikanai (2008)
 Raj Chantai (2010)
 Kanto Kwpra (2010)
 Maikhor (2012)

Borkathal Baptist Pastoral Circle 

 Debra (1978)
 Bosong thansa (1980)
 Borkathal (1986)
 Doigola (1987)
 Belphang (1987)

 Bargachia (1988)
 Khwichang (1988)
 Patni (1989)
 Yacharai (1991)
 Tokmakari (1994)

 Hathai Kwchang (2005)
 Chakhuma (2006)
 Khampar (2007)
 Bag Kami (2008)
 Radhanagar (2008)

 Salka (2010)
 Dugurai 
 Urua Kami (2012)
 Twibru
 Twiraja

Champaknagar Baptist Pastoral Circle 

 Khamting (1971)
 Bhrigudas (1977)
 Joynagar (1988)
 Jangalia (1988)
 Goyacharan (1989)
 Kulang Thagu (2013)

 Sobhamani (1990)
 Sinai Kami (1991)
 Maharam Sardar (1993)
 Hamari (1993)
 Rasu (1994)
 Rangking 

 Sarat Sardar (1995)
 Roktia (1997)
 Debra (1999)
 Lalit Mohan (1999)
 Chokhreng (2003)
 Borduar

 Waraitwisa (2004)
 Duranta (2005)
 Uakjara (2005)
 Chandra Sadhu (2006)
 Immanuel (2007)

 Mang Kanto (2008)
 Rabicharan Thakur (2010)
 Nareng (2010)
 Thastwi Hatai (2011)
 Sambhusadhu (2012)

Dakdu Baptist Pastoral Circle 

 Binon Kwpra (1975)
 Bhuban Chantai (1979)
 Madhab (1980)
 Sonamoni Sipai (1983)
 New Testament (1984)

 Boidya Kwpra (1986)
 Ramchandra (1990)
 Sibram (1998)
 Sridam Kwpra (1999)
 Chamathwi (2007)

 Sikwrai Kwpra (2007)
 Badramisip (2008)
 Thang Kami (2008)
 Lamkwthar (2010)
 Burakha (2010)

 Aitorma (2011)
 Kha Kwtal (2014)
 Boirwng

Hezamara Baptist Pastoral Circle 

 Hezamara (1994)
 Garing Kami (1994)
 Shankhola (1995)
 Doldoli (1998)
 Chandranath (2003)

 Hasing Auar (2005)
 Matia (2006)
 Sonaram Industry (2008)
 Twisa Kuphur (2009)
 Bargatha (2010)

 Ganthalwng 
 Dagia

Jamilwng Baptist Pastoral Circle 

 Bagbari (1978)
 Bhati Fatik Cherra (1987)
 Agartala City (1988)
 Singlwng (1990)
 Gangalwng (1993)

 Jamilwng (1995)
 Kami Kwtal (1997)
 Hamari (2003)
 Khakotor (2004)
 Sipai (2006)

 Khampar kami (2008)
 Pohor (2009)
 Gamsa Kwpra (2010)
 Naran Kami

Khumulwng Baptist Pastoral Circle 

 Kalasati (1976)
 Zion (1983)
 Dashram (1985)
 Joygobind (1986)
 Khutamura (1987)

 Khakchangma (1988)
 Sukia Kwpra (1988)
 Muichingor (1990)
 Chhoigoria (1990)
 Birchandra (1996)

 Bardhaman Thakur (1997)
 Khumulwng (1998)
 Rangchak (2000)
 Langma (2005)
 Dula Kwpra (2005)

 Khasrang (2006)
 Galili (2007)
 Mohan Kwpra (2008)
 Kandra (2008)
 Immanuel (2010)

 Bas Kwpra (2013)
 Rambuk (2014)
 Kandra

Mandwi Baptist Pastoral Circle 

 Thaiplok Phang (1977)
 Manikung (1978)
 Matham (1983)
 Mandwi (1986)
 Udai Kwpra (1987)

 Bishram (1989)
 Khengrai (1989)
 Sat Para (1996)
 Nepal Mura (1996)
 Naba Chandra (1997)

 Begram (1999)
 Lakhan Kwpra (2000)
 Bethel (2000)
 Baludum (2005)

 Hachwk Madhab (2007)
 Kanta Kobra (2009)
 Nolbogola (2009)
 Dondra (2015)

 Kherengbar (2010)
 Chhoigoria (2010)
 Chairgoria (2013)
 Emau (2013)
 Bokhiri (2013)
 Narayan kami (2016)

See also
 Tripura Baptist Christian Union
 Baptist World Alliance
 Christianity in Tripura
 Jampui Sakhan Baptist Association

References 
 Debbarma, Sukhendu (1996) Origin and Growth of Christianity in Tripura: With Special Reference to the New Zealand Baptist Missionary Society, 1938–1988, Indus Publishing, New Delhi. 
 Borok Baptist Convention, Rangchak Mukumu, 2010

External links
 SadarNorth.Org, the Official ePortal of Sadar North Baptist Association
 Baptist World Alliance

Tripura Baptist Christian Union
Baptist denominations in India
Christianity in Tripura
Christian organizations established in 1989
Baptist denominations established in the 20th century